= ClassiKid =

The ClassiKid musical program was founded by musician and conductor Nir Brand in 2000, in Israel.

== About the program ==
The program is a series of lecture workshops and performances held in schools, and designed to bring music to children in order to enrich their cultural experience. Brand, along with other musicians, thought that by combining information and actual musical performances in class, performed by live orchestra musicians, students will find it attractive and engaging to know more and to learn how to enjoy classical music.

== The topics and the instructors ==
There are 15 various topics and each one is about a different musical instrument. The program's instructors are all well trained performing arts teachers and artists, combining their skills with the musicians chosen to play the particular pieces, selected for every topic.

In 2007, 7 years after its foundation, over 100,000 students in Israel went through the program. The program is designed to travel and be taught in any school around the world.
